ASCRS may refer to: 

 American Society of Colon and Rectal Surgeons, a professional society for surgeons specializing in colorectal surgery
 American Society of Cataract and Refractive Surgery, a professional society for surgeons specializing in eye surgery